Carmen Aguirre is a Chilean-born Canadian. She plays a prominent role in Endgame.

Career 
Her 2011 book Something Fierce: Memoirs of a Revolutionary Daughter was a memoir of her childhood, which she spent moving around regularly with her parents, who were part of the Chilean Resistance against Augusto Pinochet. The book was selected for the 2012 edition of CBC Radio's Canada Reads, defended by musician Shad; it was announced as the winner of the competition on February 9, 2012.

Aguirre has written over 20 stage plays to date, including In a Land Called I Don't Remember, Chile Con Carne, The Trigger and The Refugee Hotel. Her comments on "cancel culture" were published in Rungh Magazine.

Filmography

Film

Television

Publications

References

External links

Bio at talonbooks.com

Canadian television actresses
Canadian women dramatists and playwrights
Canadian memoirists
Living people
Actresses from Vancouver
Writers from Vancouver
Chilean emigrants to Canada
21st-century Canadian dramatists and playwrights
Canadian women memoirists
21st-century Canadian women writers
Year of birth missing (living people)
Studio 58 people
21st-century memoirists